Rodríguez is a Spanish patronymic (meaning Son of Rodrigo; archaic: Rodericksson) and a common surname in Spain, Latin America. Its Portuguese equivalent is Rodrigues.

The "ez" signifies "son of". The name Rodrigo is the Spanish form of the German name Roderich, meaning "rich in fame", from the Gothic elements "hrod" (fame or glory) and "ric" (rich). It was the name of Roderic, the last Visigothic King before the Muslim conquest, and the subject of many legends. The surname Rodríguez could have originated in the 9th century when patronymic names originated.

In Belgium the House of Rodriguez d'Evora y Vega was for generations Great Breadmaster of Flanders, see: Marquess of Rode.

Geographical distribution
As of 2014, 25.9% of all known bearers of the surname Rodríguez  were residents of Mexico (frequency 1:52), 10.3% of Spain (1:49), 9.8% of Colombia (1:53), 9.2% of the United States (1:426), 8.4% of Venezuela (1:39), 5.9% of Cuba (1:21), 5.9% of Argentina (1:79), 3.2% of Peru (1:108), 2.7% of the Dominican Republic (1:41), 2.2% of Honduras (1:43), 1.6% of Ecuador (1:107), 1.6% of Panama (1:27), 1.6% of the Philippines (1:708), 1.3% of Bolivia (1:87), 1.3% of Chile (1:146), 1.3% of Guatemala (1:135), 1.2% of El Salvador (1:58), 1.2% of Costa Rica (1:44), 1.2% of Uruguay (1:32), 1.1% of Puerto Rico (1:35), and 1.1% of Nicaragua (1:60).

In Spain, the frequency of the surname was higher than national average (1:49) in the following regions:
 1. Canary Islands (1:21)
 2. Galicia (1:24)
 3. Asturias (1:26)
 4. Castile and León (1:39)
 5. Andalusia (1:40)
 6. Extremadura (1:41)

In Cuba, the frequency of the surname was higher than national average (1:21) in the following provinces:
 1. Ciego de Ávila (1:15)
 2. Sancti Spíritus (1:18)
 3. Cienfuegos (1:18)
 4. Holguín (1:18)
 5. Artemisa (1:18)
 6. Granma (1:18)
 7. Santiago de Cuba (1:20)
 8. Villa Clara (1:20)
 9. Matanzas (1:20)
 10. Las Tunas (1:21)

In Mexico, the frequency of the surname was higher than national average (1:52) in the following states:
 1. Nuevo León (1:29)
 2. Coahuila (1:30)
 3. Zacatecas (1:32)
 4. San Luis Potosí (1:34)
 5. Aguascalientes (1:35)
 6. Guanajuato (1:36)
 7. Tamaulipas (1:37)
 8. Durango (1:38)
 9. Nayarit (1:41)
 10. Jalisco (1:43)
 11. Colima (1:44)
 12. Chihuahua (1:44)
 13. Tlaxcala (1:49)
 14. Baja California (1:50)

People
Notable people with the surname include:

General
Gilberto Rodríguez (1929–2004), Venezuelan biologist
Jana Rodriguez Hertz (born 1970), Argentine and Uruguayan mathematician
Jessamyn Rodriguez (born 1976), Canadian-American social entrepreneur
Jesusa Rodríguez (born 1955), Mexican theater director, actress, performance artist, social activist and elected Senator of the Morena party.
 José Luis Rodríguez, El Puma, Venezuelan singer and actor
Junius P. Rodriguez (born 1957), United States academic and historian
Katya Rodríguez-Vázquez, Mexican computer scientist
Narciso Rodriguez, United States fashion designer
Robyn Rodriguez, Filipino American academic
Rubí Rodríguez, Chilean mathematician
Simón Rodríguez, Venezuelan philosopher and educator
Sonia Rodriguez, Canadian ballet dancer
Tina Rodriguez (died 1986), American murder victim
Vance Rodriguez, Hiker who was found dead in Florida in 2018
Ventura Rodríguez, Spanish architect
Verneda Rodriguez (1918–1982), American aviator

Artists 

 Diego Rodríguez de Silva y Velásquez, Velásquez, Spanish painter
Freddy Rodríguez (artist), United States artist
Peter Rodríguez (1926–2016), Mexican American painter and museum founder
Zhandra Rodríguez (born 1947), Venezuelan ballet dancer

Writers, journalists 

 Abraham Rodriguez (born 1961), Puerto Rican novelist
 Ellie Rodriguez (journalist), United States journalist
Emir Rodríguez Monegal (1921–1985), Uruguyan literary critic, editor, writer
Fátima Rodríguez (born 1961), Spanish writer, translator, professor
José Luis Rodríguez Pittí (born 1971), Panamanian writer and artist
Luis J. Rodriguez (born 1954), United States writer
Mario Rodríguez Cobos, Argentinean philosopher, author and nonviolence advocate
Silvia Rodríguez Villamil (1939-2003), Uruguayan historian, feminist, writer, activist

Explorers
Juan Rodríguez Cabrillo, Spanish navigator

Film and television
Adrián Rodríguez, Spanish actor and singer
Elizabeth Rodriguez, United States actress
Freddy Rodriguez (actor), Puerto Rican-American actor
Gina Rodriguez, American actress
Jai Rodriguez, United States actor
Lee Rodriguez, American actress
Lina Rodriguez, Colombian-Canadian filmmaker and screenwriter
Marcos A. Rodriguez. Cuban-American entrepreneur and movie producer
Mariel Rodriguez, Filipina actress and T.V. host
Mel Rodriguez, American actor
Michelle Rodriguez, United States actress
Raini Rodriguez, US television actress, older sister of Rico Rodriguez
Rico Rodriguez (actor), US television actor, younger brother of Raini Rodriguez
Robert Rodriguez, United States film director
Vincent Rodriguez III, United States actor

Music
Adrian Rodriguez (DJ), German trance producer and DJ, also known by his mononym Rodriguez
Adrián Rodríguez, Spanish actor and singer
Albita Rodríguez, United States singer
Carrie Rodriguez, United States singer-songwriter
Chris Rodriguez, American Contemporary Christian musician and singer-songwriter
Daniel Rodríguez, United States tenor
David Rodriguez (singer-songwriter), United States singer-songwriter
Felipe Rodríguez (composer), Spanish classical era composer
Felipe Rodríguez (singer), Puerto Rican singer
Gerardo Matos Rodríguez, Uruguayan composer
Johnny Rodriguez, United States country singer
José Luis Rodríguez Vélez, Panamanian composer, director, clarinetist, educator
José Luis Rodríguez (singer) ("El Puma"), Venezuelan singer and actor
Leo Rodriguez (singer), Brazilian Sertanejo music singer, songwriter
Luis Alfonso Rodríguez López-Cepero, Puerto Rican singer, songwriter and actor better known by his stage name Luis Fonsi
Marcos Rodriguez, part of the Spanish DJ production / singing duo Magan & Rodriguez. He is also known by his mononym Rodriguez
Martínez Rodríguez, Cuban vocalist and featured artist
Maxime Rodriguez, French composer
Omar Rodríguez-López, United States composer
Ramón "Raymond" Luis Ayala Rodríguez, known as Daddy Yankee, Puerto Rican rapper
Rico Rodriguez, trombonist
Silvio Rodríguez, Cuban singer-songwriter
Sixto Rodriguez, United States singer, known in his recordings as Rodriguez

Politics 
 Abelardo L. Rodríguez (1889–1967), President of Mexico
 Adelina Santos Rodriguez, Filipino politician
 Alejandro Encinas Rodríguez (born 1954), Mexican politician
 Alfonso Daniel Rodríguez Castelao (1886–1950), Spanish writer and politician
 Antonio Rodríguez San Juan, Venezuela politician
 armen Rodríguez (politician) (born 1949), Bolivian politician
 Carolyn Jane Rodriguez, American politician
 Cayetano José Rodríguez, Argentine politician
 Eduardo Rodríguez, former president of Bolivia
 Eugene Rodriguez (born 1929), New York politician 
 Eulogio Rodriguez, Filipino politician
 Frank J. Rodriguez Sr. (1920-2007), American politician
 Isidro Rodriguez (politician), Filipino politician and softball official
 Jessie Rodriguez, American politician
 Jesús Kumate Rodríguez, Mexican physician and politician 
 José Luis Rodríguez Zapatero, Spanish politician
 Liza Fernández Rodríguez (born 1973), Puerto Rican attorney and politician
 Manuel Rodríguez Erdoíza (1785–1818), Chilean lawyer and guerrilla leader, considered one of the founders of independent Chile
 Mariano Ospina Rodríguez, Colombian politician
 Miguel Ángel Rodríguez, Costa Rican politician
 Nicolás Rodríguez Carrasco, Mexican general
 Nicolás Rodríguez Peña, Argentine politician
 Nosliw Rodríguez (born 1988), Venezuelan politician
 Rufus Rodriguez (born 1953), Filipino politician
 William E. Rodriguez (1879–1970), Socialist Chicago City Council member and lawyer
 Ydanis Rodríguez, Democratic New York City Council member

Sports
Ademar Rodríguez (born 1990), Mexican footballer
Alex Rodriguez (born 1975), American baseball player
Amy Rodriguez (born 1987), American soccer player
Ángel Rodríguez (born 1992), Puerto Rican basketball player
Chi-Chi Rodríguez (born 1935), Puerto Rican professional golfer
Chris Rodriguez Jr. (born 2000), American football player
Clemente Rodríguez, Argentinian football player
Cosiri Rodríguez, Dominican volleyball player
Cristian Rodríguez (boxer), Argentine boxer
Dalidaivis Rodriguez Clark, Cuban judoka
Damian Rodriguez, Uruguayan football player
Dereck Rodríguez (born 1992), American baseball player
Douglas Rodríguez (boxer) (1950–2012), Cuban boxer
Eddy Rodríguez (catcher) (born 1985), Cuban-American baseball player and coach
Edemir Rodríguez (born 1986), Bolivian football player
Eduardo Rodríguez (left-handed pitcher), Venezuelan baseball player
Ellie Rodríguez (born 1946), Puerto Rican baseball player
Elvin Rodríguez (born 1998), Dominican baseball player
Emanuel Rodriguez (born 1986), Mexican-American professional wrestler
Emiliano Rodríguez, Spanish basketball player
Ernesto Rodríguez (born 1969), Spanish volleyball player
Eugene A. Rodriguez (1916–1996), Cuban-born American jockey
Evan Rodriguez (born 1988), American football player
Francisco Rodríguez, Venezuelan baseball pitcher
Freddy Rodríguez (baseball), former pitcher in Major League Baseball
Guido Rodríguez (born 1994), Argentinian football player
Isidro Rodríguez (footballer), Spanish footballer
Iván Rodríguez (born 1971), also known as "Pudge" Rodríguez, Puerto Rican baseball player
James Rodríguez (born 1991), Colombian football player
Jay Rodriguez, English footballer
Jefry Rodríguez, Dominican baseball player
Jemimah Rodrigues, Indian women Cricketer
Jennifer Rodriguez, American speed skater
Jesse Rodríguez,  American professional boxer
Joaquim Rodríguez, Spanish cyclist
Joely Rodríguez, Dominican baseball pitcher for the New York Mets
 Julio Rodríguez (born 2000), Dominican professional baseball outfielder
 Kevin Kuranyi Rodríguez (born 1982), German footballer
Laurent Rodriguez (born 1960), French rugby union player and coach
Luis Rodríguez (volleyball) (born 1969), Puerto Rican volleyball player
Malcolm Rodriguez (born 1999), American football player
Manuel Rodríguez (pitcher) (born 1996), Mexican baseball player
María Luisa Cuevas Rodríguez (born 1965), Spanish chess master
Marvin Rodríguez, Costa Rican football player
Maxi Rodríguez, Argentinian football player
Michael Rodríguez (footballer) (born 1981), footballer from Costa Rica
Michael Rodríguez (cyclist) (born 1989), Cyclist from Colombia
Nicolás Alejandro Rodríguez, Uruguayan football player
Nivaldo Rodríguez, Venezuelan baseball player
Pablo Sebastián Rodríguez (born 1978), Argentine basketball player
Paul Rodriguez Jr. (born 1984), Mexican-American Skateboarder
Pat Rodriguez (1900–1964), Australian rules football player and administrator
Pedro Rodríguez (cyclist, born 1950), Cuban cyclist
Pedro Rodríguez (cyclist, born 1966), Ecuadorian road cyclist
Ricardo Rodríguez (racing driver), Mexican Formula 1 race car driver
Rich Rodriguez (born 1963), American football coach
Richard Rodríguez (cyclist), Chilean road cyclist
Rowby-John Rodriguez (born 1994), Austrian darts player
Roxy-James Rodriguez (born 1991), Austrian darts player
Ruben Rodríguez (1946-1995), Filipino chess master
Rusty-Jake Rodriguez (born 2000), Austrian darts player
Sean Rodriguez (born 1985), American baseball player
Sebastián Rodríguez (footballer) (born 1992), Uruguayan footballer
Sebastián Rodríguez (swimmer) (born 1957), Spanish Paralympic swimmer
Steve Rodriguez (born 1970), American college baseball coach
Vic Rodriguez (born 1961), American baseball coach
Vicente Rodríguez (boxer), Spanish boxer
Wandy Rodríguez, Dominican baseball player
Yair Rodríguez, Mexican mixed martial artist
Yerry Rodríguez, Dominican baseball player
Yulianne Rodríguez, Cuban basketball player
A family of Mexican professional wrestlers:
Aaron Rodríguez (born 1942), better known as Mil Máscaras; also notable as an actor
José Luis Rodríguez (born 1951), better known as Dos Caras; brother of Mil Máscaras
Aaron Rodríguez (born 1976), better known as Sicodelico, Jr.; nephew of Dos Caras and Mil Máscaras
José Alberto Rodríguez (born 1977), best known as Alberto Del Rio; son of Dos Caras and nephew of Mil Máscaras
Guillermo Rodríguez (born 1988), best known as El Hijo de Dos Caras; younger brother of Alberto Del Rio

Fiction
Bender (Futurama), whose full name is Bender Bending Rodríguez
Marco Rodriguez, (played by Alejandro Edda) is a character from the television drama series Fear the Walking Dead
Rico Rodriguez (Just Cause), is a dictator removal specialist in the video game series Just Cause

See also
Rodrigues (surname), Portuguese equivalent of Rodríguez
Disambiguation Sub-Pages:

Alberto Rodríguez (disambiguation)
Alfonso Rodriguez (disambiguation)
Alejandro Rodríguez (disambiguation)
Ángel Rodríguez (disambiguation)
Antonio Rodríguez (disambiguation)
Cesar Rodriguez (disambiguation)
David Rodriguez (disambiguation)
Daniel Rodriguez (disambiguation)
Fernando Rodríguez (disambiguation)
Francisco Rodriguez (disambiguation)
Guillermo Rodríguez (disambiguation)

Héctor Rodríguez (disambiguation)
Ignacio Rodríguez (disambiguation)
Isidro Rodriguez (disambiguation)
Jorge Rodríguez (disambiguation)
José Luis Rodríguez (disambiguation)
Juan Rodríguez (disambiguation)
Luis Rodriguez (disambiguation)
Marco Rodriguez (disambiguation)
Mauricio Rodríguez (disambiguation)
Natalia Rodríguez (disambiguation)
Pablo Rodríguez (disambiguation)

References

Spanish-language surnames
Surnames of Spanish origin
Patronymic surnames
Lists of people by surname
Surnames from given names
Surnames of Honduran origin
Surnames of Salvadoran origin
Surnames of Colombian origin
Surnames of Uruguayan origin
Surnames of Puerto Rican origin